Bugün was a Turkish daily newspaper. It was established in 2005. Columnists and journalists working for it have included Cengiz Çandar, Ahmet Almaz, Toktamış Ateş and Kamil Maman. 

Bugün was founded in January 2003 as Dünden Bugüne Tercüman, an attempt to resurrect Tercüman. It was renamed in 2005. The paper belonged to the Koza Ipek Holding, a conglomerate considered to belong to the network of followers of the U.S.-based preacher Fethullah Gülen. During the 2010s, the paper was aligned with the conservative positions of the governing Justice and Development Party (AKP), but after a rift in 2013 it started criticizing the AKP and in 2015 was perceived to suffer pressure as part of the media opposed to the Government.

References

External links
  

Turkish-language newspapers
Newspapers published in Istanbul
Defunct newspapers published in Turkey
Newspapers established in 2005
2005 establishments in Turkey
Mass media shut down in the 2016 Turkish purges
2016 disestablishments in Turkey
Publications disestablished in 2016
Daily newspapers published in Turkey
Companies formerly affiliated with the Gülen movement
Banned newspapers